Theta Andromedae is a binary star system in the northern constellation of Andromeda. Theta Andromedae, Latinized from θ Andromedae, is its Bayer designation. On the Bortle Dark-Sky Scale, this makes it visible to the naked eye from outside urban regions. Based on its motion through space, this system appears to be a member of the Sirius supercluster.

The brighter component is a white hued A-type main-sequence star with a stellar classification of A2 V. It is one of the least photometrically variable stars known. The star shows a high rate of rotation with a projected rotational velocity of 102 km/s. It has an estimated 2.8 times the mass of the Sun and is radiating 113 times the Sun's luminosity from its photosphere at an effective temperature of 8,960 K. The relatively high chemical abundances of iron and heavier elements suggests it may be a fast rotating Am star.

A stellar companion was detected in 1986 and reported in 1989. This fainter companion is separated from Theta Andromedae by 0.06 arcseconds.

Naming

References

External links
 Image Theta Andromedae

A-type main-sequence stars
Am stars
Spectroscopic binaries
Binary stars

Andromeda (constellation)
Andromedae, Theta
BD+37 0034
Andromedae, 24
001280
001366
0063